Olga Igorevna Fomina (née Chernoivanenko; born 17 April 1989) is a Russian handball player for HC Lada and the Russian national team.

She has played on the Russian national team and participated in the 2011 World Women's Handball Championship in Brazil and the 2012 Summer Olympics.

References

External links

1989 births
Living people
Russian female handball players
Handball players at the 2012 Summer Olympics
Sportspeople from Samara, Russia
Expatriate handball players
Olympic handball players of Russia
Russian expatriate sportspeople in North Macedonia
Handball players at the 2020 Summer Olympics
Medalists at the 2020 Summer Olympics
Olympic medalists in handball
Olympic silver medalists for the Russian Olympic Committee athletes